William Hunter Bennett (5 November 1910 – 23 July 1980) was a general authority of the Church of Jesus Christ of Latter-day Saints (LDS Church) from 1970 until his death.

Bennett was born in Taber, Alberta, Canada. He attended the School of Agriculture in Raymond, Alberta, and earned bachelor's and master's degrees in agriculture from Utah State University (USU), as well as a Ph.D. in agriculture from the University of Wisconsin–Madison. He joined the faculty of USU as a professor of agronomy.

Bennett married Patricia June Christensen.  They were the parents of six children.

Bennett was an avid sportsman and in 1936 tried out for the Canadian Summer Olympics team in the shot put and discus throw.

In 1970, while serving in the LDS Church as a regional representative, Bennett was called as an Assistant to the Quorum of the Twelve Apostles and a general authority of the church. Bennett served in this position until 1976, when the position of Assistant to the Twelve was abolished. At that time, Bennett became a member of the First Quorum of the Seventy, where he served until 1978, when he was designated as an emeritus general authority.

While an Assistant, Bennett was assigned to deal with work in Africa and was involved in an ordeal in which missionaries were confused as to whether they were to baptize a number of black South Africans who wished to join the Church, despite the restrictions on blacks in holding the priesthood at that time. Bennett and other officials gave the green light to baptize, but the missionaries had concerns that such a move would anger the South African government, which they believed had reached a tacit agreement with the Church in the past stipulating that Mormon missionaries could preach in the country provided they abstain from proselytizing black South Africans. The missionaries were also worried about the complications involved in intermingling blacks with the white believers as the former, lacking priesthood authority, would not be able to assist with things such as home teaching. They also pointed out that the whites needed government permits to enter black areas. After consulting with Marion G. Romney, Bennet wrote back to a missionary saying "It appears that we have received direction from the Brethren that this is not the time for us to move ahead with a program for baptizing the Bantus in South Africa. I am sorry about this situation but when the total picture is kept in mind it would appear that there are very good reasons for going easy at the present time." This policy stood in place until the 1978 Revelation opening the priesthood to men of all races.

Bennett died at his home in Bountiful, Utah.

References

Sources
 “Elder William H. Bennett Dies,” Ensign, Sep. 1980, p. 79
 Leon R. Hartshorn. Outstanding Stories by General Authorities. (Salt Lake City: Deseret Book Company, 1975) Vol. 3, p. 1

External links
Grampa Bill's G.A. Pages: William H. Bennett

1910 births
1980 deaths
Canadian general authorities (LDS Church)
Members of the First Quorum of the Seventy (LDS Church)
People from Taber, Alberta
University of Wisconsin–Madison College of Agricultural and Life Sciences alumni
Utah State University alumni
Utah State University faculty
Regional representatives of the Twelve
Canadian agronomists
Assistants to the Quorum of the Twelve Apostles
Latter Day Saints from Wisconsin
Canadian expatriates in the United States
20th-century agronomists